Koodikazhcha is a 1991 Indian Malayalam film,  directed by T. S. Suresh Babu and produced by Thomi Kunju. The film stars Jayaram, Jagadish, Urvashi and Usha in lead roles. The film had musical score by S. P. Venkatesh.

Plot
Alice belongs to a big , but poor family with three sisters, her mechanic father and grandmother. She is working as receptionist in Pulikkattil Financiers. Sunny comes as a broker to this finance company for a vehicle, where he meets Alice. Sunny and Scariah start working for Mathew Pulikkadan as vehicle recovery agents. Sunny likes Alice and Scariah likes her younger sister Annie. Alice’s father Mathachan gets accused  in a murder investigation and gets arrested. Sunny helps prove his innocence and the whole family feels grateful. Mathachan reveals his past life to Sunny in which he lived happily with his family as a farmer in a village. The live next to a rich, cruel moneylender and his arrogant sons who torture them in various ways, including molesting Mathachans eldest daughter Mollykutty. Finally they had to move to the city. Sunny decides to get justice for this family.

Sunny proposes to Alice but she says she will only settle down after her elder sisters are married off. Sunny finds grooms for her two elder sisters. All four sisters get married. They all move back to the village to reclaim Mathachan’s house and property.

Cast

Jayaram as Sunny
Jagadish as Scariah
Babu Namboothiri as Mathachan
Urvashi as Alice, Mathachan's third daughter 
Usha as Annie, Mathachan's youngest daughter
Sukumaran as Advocate Thommichan
Babu Antony as Williams
Chitra as Mollykutty, Mathachan's eldest daughter
Adoor Bhavani as Mathachan's mother
T. R. Omana as Annamma, Mathachan's wife
Jagathy Sreekumar as Mathew Pulikkadan
Prathapachandran as Thachampalli Divakara Panikkar
Shivaji as Gopinatha Panikkar
Santhosh as Viswanatha Panikkar
Keerikkadan Jose as 'Mortuary' Karunan
Kanakalatha as Saraswathi
K. P. A. C. Sunny as Circle Inspector Harikumar
Jagannathan as Eenashu
 Kaduvakulam Antony as Kuriyapilly, the Marriage Broker

References

External links
 

1991 films
1991 romantic drama films
1990s Malayalam-language films
Indian romantic drama films
Films directed by T. S. Suresh Babu